Ana Padrão (born 4 July 1967) is a Portuguese film actress. She appeared in more than eighty films since 1987.

Selected filmography

References

External links

1967 births
Living people
Portuguese film actresses
People from Lisbon